Edward Christopher Schwarzman (8 March 1946 – 18 January 2023) was an Australian rules footballer who played with St Kilda in the Victorian Football League (VFL).

Schwarzman later played with Sandringham in the Victorian Football Association. He died on 18 January 2023, at the age of 76.

References

External links 

Ted Schwarzman's playing statistics from The VFA Project

1946 births
2023 deaths
Australian rules footballers from Victoria (Australia)
St Kilda Football Club players
Sandringham Football Club players